Hopechest is the only studio album by American country music artist Stephanie Bentley. It was released in 1996 via Epic Records Nashville and it accounted for four singles, in addition to reprising a single from Ty Herndon's debut album What Mattered Most on which Bentley provided duet vocals. The album reached a peak of 60 on the U.S. Billboard Top Country Albums charts.

Content 
Before the release of this album, Bentley had charted as a duet vocalist on Ty Herndon's 1996 single "Heart Half Empty", the third single from his debut album What Mattered Most, issued on Epic Records. After this single (which is also included on Hopechest) was Bentley's first solo release, "Who's That Girl". This song, her only solo Top 40 country hit, peaked at number 32 on the Billboard country charts. Following it were "Once I Was the Light of Your Life" at number 60, "The Hopechest Song" at number 47, and finally "Dead Ringer", which failed to chart. The album was produced by Paul Worley and Todd Wilkes, except for "Heart Half Empty", which Ed Seay and Doug Johnson produced. "Half the Moon" was previously recorded by Tanya Tucker on her 1992 album Can't Run from Yourself.

Critical reception
Hopechest received a B+ rating from Entertainment Weekly critic Alanna Nash. She thought that Bentley did not have a distinctive voice but still "delivered with smarts and sass". Nash also called the song selection "nearly faultless." Chet Flippo of Billboard gave the album a positive review, saying that Bentley "has a big, controlled voice, solid writing chops, and an ear for a good song".

Track listing

Personnel 
Stephanie Bentley - lead vocals
Bruce Bouton - steel guitar
Gerald Boyd - acoustic guitar
Spady Brannan - bass guitar
Steve Brewster - drums, percussion
Mike Cass - steel guitar
Joe Chemay - bass guitar
Dan Dugmore - steel guitar
Rob Hajacos - fiddle
Tony Harrell - piano, keyboards
Dann Huff - electric guitar
Chris Leuzinger - electric guitar
Carl Marsh - string section
Steve Nathan - keyboards
Bobby Ogdin - piano, keyboards
Russ Pahl - acoustic guitar
Billy Panda - electric guitar
Robert Patin - piano, keyboards
Brent Rowan - electric guitar
Michael Severs - electric guitar
Eric Silver - mandolin, fiddle
Michael Spriggs - acoustic guitar
Billy Joe Walker, Jr. - acoustic guitar
Biff Watson - acoustic guitar
Lonnie Wilson - drums, percussion
Paul Worley - acoustic guitar

Chart performance

References 

[ allmusic ((( Hopechest > Overview )))]

1996 debut albums
Stephanie Bentley albums
Epic Records albums
Albums produced by Paul Worley